Earl Metcalfe (March 11, 1889 – January 26, 1928) was an American actor.

Biography
Born in 1889, Metcalfe appeared in the films The Fortune Hunter, While New York Sleeps, What Women Will Do, White Eagle, While Justice Waits, The Great Night, Look Your Best, Skid Proof, Fair Week, The Silent Accuser, Silk Stocking Sal, The Man Without a Country, The Ship of Souls, Partners Again, With Buffalo Bill on the U. P. Trail, The Midnight Sun, The Call of the Klondike, The Midnight Message, The Mystery Club, Atta Boy, Love's Blindness, Remember, The Notorious Lady, and The Devil's Saddle, among others.

In a movie fight with actor/director Joseph Kaufman, Kaufman accidentally lost some teeth during the filming.

Metcalfe died during a flight in a biplane in 1928 over Glendale or Burbank California. He had taken up flying as a recreation and was undergoing pilot training. Various sources have Metcalfe falling from the airplane or jumping from it, indicating a suicide. The plane is reported to have been looping-the-loop or in a barrel roll, two different aerial maneuvers. The pilot Roy Wilson was unharmed.

Partial filmography

A Romance of the Border (1912)*short
A Girl's Bravery (1912)*short
The Moonshiner's Daughter (1912)*short
Gentleman Joe (1912)*short
Juan and Juanita (1912)*short
The Water Rats (1912)*short
Kitty and the Bandits (1912)*short
The Bravery of Dora (1912)*short
The Mexican Spy (1913)*short
Private Smith (1913)*short
The Price of Jealousy (1913)*short
Down on the Rio Grande (1913)*short
The Regeneration of Nancy (1913)*short
The First Prize (1913)*short
The Soul of a Rose (1913)*short
Sixes and Nines (1913)
The Moonshiner's Wife (1913)*short
Women of the Desert (1913)*short
The Daughters of Men (1914)
The Ringtailed Rhinosceros (1915)
The World to Live In (1919)
Coax Me (1919)
The Battler (1919)
The Woman of Lies (1919)
The Poison Pen (1919)
The Fortune Hunter (1920)
The Chamber Mystery (1920)
 The Garter Girl (1920)
While New York Sleeps (1920)
The Face at Your Window (1920)
What Women Will Do (1921)
Mother Eternal (1921)
 Eden and Return (1921)
White Eagle (1922)
 Back to Yellow Jacket (1922)
Ignorance (1922)
 The New Teacher (1922)
 Boomerang Justice (1922)
While Justice Waits (1922)
The Great Night (1922)
The Power of a Lie (1922)
Look Your Best (1923)
Skid Proof (1923)
The Lone Wagon (1923)
Fair Week (1924)
Surging Seas (1924)
The Valley of Hate (1924)
The Courageous Coward (1924)
The Silent Accuser (1924)
Silk Stocking Sal (1924)
The Man Without a Country (1925)
The Ship of Souls (1925)
Sin Cargo (1926)
The High Flyer (1926)
Daring Deeds (1927)
Night Life (1927)

References

External links

 
 Earle Metcalfe allmovie.com

1889 births
1928 deaths
People from Newport, Kentucky
Male actors from Kentucky
20th-century American male actors
American male film actors